Radhe is an upcoming Indian Bhojpuri-language action drama film directed by Ritesh Thakur and produced by Neha Shree under his banner "Neha Shree Entertainment". Its stars Ravi Kishan and Arvind Akela 'Kallu' in the lead role and Neha Shree and Mohini Ghosh in an opposite role. Priyanka Pandit, Seema Singh, Avtar Gill, Pappu Yadav and others play supporting roles.

Cast
Ravi Kishan as Om
Arvind Akela 'Kallu'
Neha Shree
Mohini Ghosh
Priyanka Pandit
Pappu Yadav
Avtar Gill

Production
Filming of this film was done in beautiful locations of Rajpipla in Gujarat.

The film is directed by Ritesh Thakur and produced by Neha Shree. The cinematography has been done by Yash Bhardwaj while choreography is by Rikki Gupta. Indrajeet is the writer, Sanjay R. Das is the editor, Hira Yadav is the action director and VFX is done by Sujit Chaudhary.

Music
The soundtrack of "Radhe" was composed by Ritesh Thakur with lyrics written by Fanindra Rao, Shyam Dehati, Rajesh Saranpuri, Arun Bihari and Shomdayal Sohra. It is produced under the "SRK Music label".

References

Unreleased Indian films
Upcoming Bhojpuri-language films